Hammel Madden Deroche,  (August 27, 1840 – March 10, 1916) was an Ontario (Canada) lawyer and political figure. He represented Addington in the Legislative Assembly of Ontario as a Liberal member from 1871 to 1883.

He was born in Newburgh in Upper Canada in 1840, the son of Pascal Deroche, and graduated from the University of Toronto in 1868. During that time, he served with the Queen's Own Rifles and fought against the Fenians at the Battle of Ridgeway. He taught school at Newburgh and Napanee. He also served as inspector of schools for Napanee.

Deroche went on to study law, articling with James Bethune, and was called to the bar in 1874. He practiced law in partnership with Judge Madden. In 1872, he married Sarah Ann Christian Pile. He was named Queen's Counsel in 1890. In 1899, Deroche was appointed crown attorney for the county.

He was a Freemason and a member of the Church of England. He died in Napanee in 1916.

External links 

History of the County of Lennox and Addington, WS Herrington (1913)
A Cyclopæedia of Canadian biography : being chiefly men of the time ..., GM Rose (1886)

1840 births
1916 deaths
Ontario Liberal Party MPPs
Canadian King's Counsel